Elizabeth, Eliza, Liz or Beth Allen or Allan may refer to:

Actresses
Elizabeth Allen (actress) (1929–2006), American stage, film and television performer 
Beth Allen (born 1984), New Zealand stage, film and, primarily, television actress
Elizabeth Allan (1910–1990), English stage, film and television actress
Elizabeth Anne Allen (born 1970), American actress
Elizabeth Bryan Allen (1904–1992), American actress

Writers
Eliza Allen (1826–?), American memoirist
Elizabeth Akers Allen (1832–1911), American poet, journalist and author
Liz Allen (born 1969), Irish writer
Elizabeth Allen (poet), poet from Australia

Others
Beth Allen (golfer) (born 1981), American professional golfer
Beth E. Allen, professor of economics
Betsy Love Allen, Chickasaw plantation owner who influenced the first Married Women's Property Act in the United States 
Elizabeth Allen d.1727 who left money for a school in Barnet, Elizabeth Allen School and an educational foundation   
Eliza Allen Houston (1809–1861), first wife of Tennessee governor Sam Houston
Elizabeth Allen Rosenbaum, American film and television director
Eliza Allen Starr (1824–1901), American artist known for her Catholic art
Liz Allan (cricketer) (born 1948), former New Zealand cricketer
Elizabeth Bonner Allen (born 1964), British documentary film maker
Elizabeth Allen (chef) (born 1988), British/Singaporean chef
Elizabeth Almira Allen (1854–1919), American teacher and teachers' rights advocate
Elizabeth M. Allen, political advisor who served as the White House Deputy Communications Director

Characters
Protagonist of Enid Blyton's children's novel series, The Naughtiest Girl
Liz Allen, more frequently rendered as Liz Allan, love interest of Marvel Comics hero Peter Parker, alias Spider-Man

See also

Allen (surname)